In mathematics, a coherent topos is a topos generated by a collection of quasi-compact quasi-separated objects closed under finite products.

See also 
spectral space

References

External links 
https://ncatlab.org/nlab/show/coherent+topos

Topos theory